"Kimse Yok Mu?" is a single recorded by Serbian-Turkish recording artist Emina Jahović. It was released in 2012 through Doğan Music Company (DMC), in collaboration with Yada Productions and Turkcell Müzik.

The song was written and composed by Emina Jahović and Mustafa Sandal, the leading pop star from Turkey. The lyrics revolve around Emina asking a man to go back to her. It is her second single in Turkish. The Serbian version called "I da mogu" was also made available in 2012.

On 27 February 2013, "Kimse Yok Mu?" won the 3rd Media Awards of OMU (Turkish: OMÜ 3. Medya Ödülleri) for Best Breakthrough Album. The 3rd Media Awards of OMU were held at the Atatürk Congress and Culture Center in Samsun.

Music videos
Miloš Nadaždin directed the accompanying music videos for "Kimse Yok Mu?" and "I da mogu". In these videos, Jahović is often referred to as the Turkish JLo since critics noted costume references and artistic similarities to the work of Jennifer Lopez.

Croatia Records
As of 2012, due to Emina's association with the record label Croatia Records, the song "Kimse Yok Mu?" is the first non-Croatian song that has been broadcast on CMC which is the largest Croatian music channel and broadcast only Croatian music and music of Croatian production.

Release
The single "Kimse Yok Mu?" was released through Doğan Music Company (DMC) in November 2012.

Track listing

Notes
 Indicates a lyricist

Charts

References

2012 singles
Emina Jahović songs
2012 songs
Songs written by Emina Jahović